Percy Mills (5 January 1896 – 3 March 1971) was a British weightlifter. He competed in the men's lightweight event at the 1920 Summer Olympics.

References

External links
 

1896 births
1971 deaths
British male weightlifters
Olympic weightlifters of Great Britain
Weightlifters at the 1920 Summer Olympics
Sportspeople from Wakefield